Standard Hotels is a group of seven boutique hotels in New York City (Meatpacking District and East Village), Miami Beach, London, Maldives, Ibiza, and Hua Hin, Thailand. The hotels are operated by Standard International Management. The two original properties in Hollywood and Los Angeles closed in 2021 and 2022 respectively.

History 

The first Standard Hotel, The Standard, Hollywood,  opened on the Sunset Strip in 1999 in West Hollywood, California. It was developed by Andre Balazs Properties. The structure was originally built in 1962 as the Thunderbird Motel, and had become a retirement home when Balazs purchased and remodeled it. Original investors in the Hollywood hotel were Leonardo DiCaprio, Cameron Diaz, Benicio del Toro, D'arcy Wretzky and James Iha.

In 2002, a twelve-story, marble-clad building formerly known as Superior Oil Company Building (completed in 1956) was converted into The Standard, Downtown LA. The renovation was designed by Koning Eizenberg Architecture, Inc., and included the addition of a roof-top pool and bar, and a two-story lobby space reconfigured from the old banking hall. In 2003, the building was added to the National Register of Historic Places.

In 2006, The Standard Hotels expanded to Miami Beach, where they opened The Standard Spa, Miami Beach. Located on Biscayne Bay, The Standard Spa, Miami Beach, is a holistic and hydrotherapy-oriented spa hotel.

In 2008, The Standard Hotels brand completed their most ambitious project to date, with the opening of The Standard, High Line. It was the first time the brand built a property from the ground up, rather than renovating an older space. The design was the work of the Ennead Architects.

In 2011, Andre Balazs properties completed the acquisition of The Cooper Square Hotel. The building was gutted and transformed into The Standard, East Village.

In the Fall of 2013, the brand's founder, Andre Balazs, sold an 80% stake in the company to Standard International.

In July 2019, a property in London opened.

On November 1, 2019, a property in Maldives opened.

The Standard Hollywood, which closed temporarily in 2020 due to the COVID-19 pandemic, closed permanently on January 22, 2021, due to a 2019 increase in the lease price on the hotel and the economic impact of the COVID-19 pandemic.

The Standard Downtown LA, which also closed temporarily in 2020 due to the COVID-19 pandemic, never reopened, was closed permanently on January 22, 2022.

Locations
The Standard Spa, Miami Beach (Miami Beach, Florida), a holistic and hydrotherapy spa hotel on Biscayne Bay – 2006
The Standard, High Line (New York City), straddling the High Line in the Meatpacking District of Manhattan – 2008
The Standard, East Village (New York City), formerly the Cooper Square Hotel – 2011
The Standard, London – 2019
The Standard, Maldives – 2019
The Standard, Hua Hin – 2021
The Standard, Ibiza – 2022
The Standard, Bangkok Mahanakhon – 2022

Upcoming locations
The Standard, Melbourne – 2023
The Standard, Singapore – 2023
The Standard, Lisbon – 2024
The Standard, Dublin – 2024
The Standard, Brussels – 2025

Former locations
The Standard Hollywood in West Hollywood – 1999–2021
The Standard, Downtown LA, formerly the Superior Oil Company Building – 2002–2022

References 
Notes

Bibliography

External links 

Standard Hotels website

Hotel chains in the United States
Hospitality companies of the United States
Boutique resort chains